Saint Venerius ( San Venerio) (ca. 560–630) was a monk and hermit.  He is venerated as a saint by the Catholic Church and is the patron saint of the Gulf of La Spezia and, as of 1961, the patron saint of lighthouse keepers.

Life
Venerius was a hermit in a monastery situated on the island of Tino in the Ligurian Sea. Later he served as abbot until his death in 630.

It is thought that a sanctuary was constructed at the place of Venerius' death to contain his relics and that this was extended to form a monastery in eleventh century. The remains of the monastery can be seen on the northern coast of the island.

The relics of the saint seem to have resided in Luni, but due to attacks by Vikings and Moors, the bishopric transferred its seat to Sarzana.  The relics of Venerius were sent, however, to Reggio Emilia, where they were placed side-by-side with those of Saint Prosper of Reggio (San Prospero) and those of Cosmas and Damian.  They were later translated to Tino, now within the diocese of La Spezia, in a solemn ceremony.

The island of Tino has restricted access as part of a military zone. However, an exception is made on 13 September, the Feast of Saint Venerius. On that day, a statue of Venerius is carried out to the sea from La Spezia to the island, accompanied by a blessing by the bishop of all of the boats in the Gulf of La Spezia.

See also

Skete
Lavra

Notes

Footnotes
No reliable account exists of Venerius' life. Some scholars place it in the ninth century.

External links
 San Venerio e i Santi Spezzini

People from the Province of La Spezia
7th-century Christian saints
Italian saints
Italian hermits